Kinneil railway station, also known as Kinneil Halt, is a railway station in Bo'ness, Scotland. The station is a request stop to start the tour of the Kinneil nature reserve. It is located in the area previously occupied by Kinneil Colliery and as a result, the railway in the vicinity is very tightly curved and has a speed limit of just 10 mph due to possible subsidence. Between 1985 and 1989 it was the line's terminus and included a loop which has now been partially removed.

Original station
The original station was opened by the North British Railway on 2 January 1899 and closed on 22 September 1930. It was subsequently demolished after closure.

References

External links
Scottish Railway Preservation Society
Video footage of Kinneil Halt

Heritage railway stations in Falkirk (council area)
Railway stations built for UK heritage railways
Bo'ness
Railway stations in Great Britain opened in 1899
Railway stations in Great Britain closed in 1930
Former North British Railway stations
Railway stations in Great Britain opened in 1985
1899 establishments in Scotland
1985 establishments in Scotland
1930 disestablishments in Scotland